Vaira is a feminine Latvian given name. Notable people with the name include:

Vaira Paegle (born 1942), Latvian politician
Vaira Vīķe-Freiberga (born 1937), sixth President of Latvia

References

Latvian feminine given names